Bernotas is a Lithuanian language family name. It may refer to:
Arturs Bernotas,  Latvian chess player
Eric Bernotas,  American skeleton racer
Juozas Bernotas, Lithuanian windsurfer
Violeta Bernotaitė, Lithuanian olympic rower
, Lithuanian state prize winning poet and translator

 
Lithuanian-language surnames